Muktesh "Micky" Pant (born 1954) is the former CEO of Yum China.

Professional background 
After completing his graduation from the Indian Institute of Technology in Kanpur, India, Pant worked in the marketing department of Hindustan Lever. Subsequently, Pant worked for PepsiCo and then Reebok, where he helped found Reebok India – Pant was employee number 1. After a stint as global brand manager at Reebok, Pant became chief marketing officer at Yum! Brands in 2005. In this capacity, Pant was responsible for overseeing marketing practices at the world's largest fast food restaurant company. Yum! has more than 37,000 restaurants worldwide in 110 countries. During Pant's tenure, Yum! has targeted non-US markets heavily in response to increased consumer spending on food in the developing world.

References 

Living people
IIT Kanpur alumni
People from Nainital
Indian emigrants to the United States
American people of Indian descent
American chief executives of Fortune 500 companies
1954 births